Chasing Time: The Bedlam Sessions is a live album and DVD released by James Blunt in 2006 as a follow-up to his 2004 debut album, Back to Bedlam. The set contains a live album from Ireland, as well as a DVD featuring a recorded performance at the BBC, music videos for "High", "You're Beautiful", "Wisemen" and "Goodbye My Lover", and interviews taken from various television appearances and studio sessions. The audio CD was also included as part of a deluxe package of Back to Bedlam that was available in the United States, thus meaning that this release was not issued there.

Track listing 
 Disc One - DVD
 "Billy" (Blunt, Ghost, Skarbek) – 3:46
 "High" (Blunt, Ross) – 3:55
 "Wisemen" (Blunt, Hogarth, Skarbek) – 3:49
 "Goodbye My Lover" (Blunt, Skarbek) – 4:18
 "Tears And Rain" (Blunt, Chambers) – 4:17
 "Out of My Mind" (Blunt, Skarbek) - 3:18
 "So Long, Jimmy" (Blunt, Hogarth) – 5:25
 "You're Beautiful" (Blunt, Ghost, Skarbek) – 3:38
 "Cry" (Blunt, Skarbek) – 3:44
 "No Bravery" (Blunt, Skarbek) – 3:36
 "Where Is My Mind?" (Francis, Black) – 4:07
 "High" (Video) - 4:03
 "High" (The Making of the Video)
 "Wisemen" (Video) - 4:00
 "Wisemen" (The Making of the Video)
 "You're Beautiful" (Video) - 3:23
 "You're Beautiful" (The Making of the Video)
 "High" (2005 Video) - 4:02
 "High" (The Making of the 2005 Video)
 "Goodbye My Lover" (Video) - 4:19
 "Goodbye My Lover" (The Making of the Video)
 "Being Blunt" (Documentary)
 "Interview & Photo Gallery"

 Disc Two - CD
 "Wisemen" (Blunt, Hogarth, Skarbek) – 3:49
 "High" (Blunt, Ross) – 3:55
 "Cry" (Blunt, Skarbek) – 3:44
 "Goodbye My Lover" (Blunt, Skarbek) – 4:18
 "So Long, Jimmy" (Blunt, Hogarth) – 5:25
 "Sugar Coated" (Blunt, Hogarth, Skarbek) – 3:51
 "You're Beautiful" (Blunt, Ghost, Skarbek) – 3:38
 "Billy" (Blunt, Ghost, Skarbek) – 3:46
 "Fall at Your Feet" (Neil Finn) – 2:42
 "Tears And Rain" (Blunt, Chambers) – 4:17
 "No Bravery" (Blunt, Skarbek) – 3:36
 "Where Is My Mind?" (Francis, Black) – 4:07

Personnel 
 Paul Beard – Keyboards, Vocals
 James Blunt – Guitar (Acoustic), Keyboards, Vocals
 Karl Brazil – Drums
 Mark Jonathan Davis – Director
 Valerie Etienne – Vocals
 Dan Fitzgerald – Engineer
 Paul Fredericks – Vocals
 Joe Garland – Vocals
 Mary Gormley – A&R
 Robert Hayden – Management
 Phil Heyes – Director
 Alison Howe – Producer
 Todd Interland – Management
 Mary Ellen Matthews – Cover Photo
 Malcolm Moore – Bass, Vocals
 Brian Murray – Guitar Technician
 Conor O'Mahony – A&R
 Tim Summerhayes – Mixing
 Dennie Vidal – Engineer

Charts 
 Music DVD Charts

 Album Charts

Certifications

References

James Blunt albums
2006 live albums
2006 video albums
Live video albums